Joe Amato may refer to:
Joe Amato (poet) (born 1955), American writer
Joe Amato (dragster driver) (born 1944), American dragster driver
Joseph Amato (mobster) (died 1927), Chicago mobster
Joseph A. Amato (born 1938), author and scholar of history